Molly Bordonaro is managing partner of Gerding Edlen and the former American ambassador to Malta (2005–09).

Bordonaro was born in Portland, Oregon. She earned an undergraduate degree from University of Colorado.

She began working at Gerding Edlen in 2009, and was made managing partner in 2017.  She is also a member of the board of directors for Moda Health and the National Women's History Museum. She is also a member of the Pension Real Estate Association, Technology and Sustainability Affinity Group, and on the advisory board for commercial real estate at Portland State University.

She ran for Congress on the Republican ticket in 1998 from Oregon's 1st congressional district but lost to David Wu. She was the Chairman of the Northwest Region for the 2004 Bush-Cheney Campaign.

In 2009, at the end of her service as ambassador to Malta, Bordonaro was awarded the Medal of Merit by Maltese president Edward Fenech-Adami. She is the first American ambassador, and only the third in history, to receive the honor.

References

External links
US Ambassador Molly Bordonaro says security is a big issue for everyone

Living people
Year of birth missing (living people)
American women ambassadors
University of Colorado Boulder alumni
Ambassadors of the United States to Malta
American women business executives
Oregon Republicans
21st-century American women